

Medalists

Standings
Men's Competition

References
Complete 1971 Mediterranean Games Standings Archived

Sports at the 1971 Mediterranean Games
1971